Singin' the Blues is the first LP album by American bluesman B.B. King, released in 1957 by the Bihari brothers on their Crown budget label. It is a compilation album whose songs were issued between 1951 and 1956 on singles by RPM Records and most had reached the Top 10 on Billboard's Race/R&B singles charts. King continued to perform and record several of the songs throughout his career, such as "Every Day I Have the Blues", "Woke Up This Morning", and "Sweet Little Angel".

Critical reception
Billboard (June 10, 1957): "One of the better r.&b. artists, a goodly portion of B.B. King's hits have been put together in this set. B.B.'s country blues vocal style, together with his frenetic guitar method, is enough to sell the r.&b. market. Price here is the attraction, too."

In an overview for AllMusic, critic Bill Dahl rated the album four and a half out of five stars and called it "Absolutely seminal material; his classic hits." The Penguin Guide to Blues Recordings says that it is “self-evidently a near-faultless album.”

Reissues
Singin' the Blues has been reissued and repackaged several times, including by P-Vine Records (Japan), Ace Records (UK), and Flair Records/Virgin Records (US).

Track listing
Details are taken from the 1991 Flair Records/Virgin Records CD reissue (the original Crown LP does not list running times) and may differ from other sources.

References

Sources

B.B. King compilation albums
Crown Records albums
1957 compilation albums